Zhatay (Satay, Hatay) is an urban locality (an urban-type settlement) under the administrative jurisdiction of the city of republic significance of Yakutsk in the Sakha Republic, Russia, located on the left bank of the Lena River,  downstream of Yakutsk. As of the 2010 Census, its population was 9,504.

History
Previously called Zhataystroy, it was granted urban-type settlement status and renamed on April 28, 1948.

Administrative and municipal status
Within the framework of administrative divisions, the urban-type settlement of Zhatay and eleven rural localities are subordinated to the city of republic significance of Yakutsk, which is an administrative unit with the status equal to that of the districts. As a municipal division, Zhatay is incorporated as Zhatay Urban Okrug. Yakutsk and the eleven rural localities are independently incorporated as Yakutsk Urban Okrug.

Transportation
Zhatay is a river port with a shipyard.

References

Notes

Sources
Official website of the Sakha Republic. Registry of the Administrative-Territorial Divisions of the Sakha Republic. Yakutsk. 

Urban-type settlements in the Sakha Republic
Populated places on the Lena River